Kalinino is a rural locality (a selo) and the administrative center of Kalininsky Selsoviet of Volodarsky District, Astrakhan Oblast, Russia. The population was 870 as of 2010. There are 6 streets.

Geography 
Kalinino is located on the Buzan River, 34 km southeast of Volodarsky (the district's administrative centre) by road. Narimanovo is the nearest rural locality.

References 

Rural localities in Volodarsky District, Astrakhan Oblast